Saint Tochumra (or Tocomracht) was a holy virgin, or possibly two virgins, in medieval Ireland. 
Her (or their) feast day is 11 June.

Monks of Ramsgate account

The monks of St Augustine's Abbey, Ramsgate wrote in their Book of Saints (1921),

Butler's account

The hagiographer Alban Butler (1710–1773) wrote in his Lives of the Fathers, Martyrs, and Other Principal Saints under June 11,

O'Hanlon's account

John O'Hanlon (1821–1905) wrote of Tochumra or Tocomracht in his Lives of the Irish Saints under June 11.

Notes

Sources

 
 
 

Female saints of medieval Ireland